The Townline Brook Bridge, also known as the Bennett Park Bridge, is a bridge carrying a private residential driveway over Townline Brook in Walton Township, Michigan, near 5882 Battle Creek Road. It is the only remaining 1870s bowstring truss bridge in the state of Michigan. It was listed on the National Register of Historic Places in 2000.

History
This bridge was constructed by the Wrought Iron Bridge Company of Canton Ohio. The original location of this bridge is unknown, but it was likely placed near Charlotte, Michigan in the late 19th century. At some point in the early 20th century it was moved to Bennett Park in Charlotte. In 1968 it was moved again to the present location.

Description
This bridge is a bowstring truss bridge, patented by bridge designer Squire Whipple in 1841. It is a six-panel, pin-connected structure resting on earthen embankments in a farmyard. It is composed of an upper cord made of back-to-back channels with battens and a cover plate and a lower chord made of paired flat bars. The outside and center verticals are X-shaped members and the diagonals are crossed rods with turnbuckles. The floor is made of I-beams U-bolted to the superstructure.

References

External links
 Photo Gallery from HistoricBridges.org

		
National Register of Historic Places in Eaton County, Michigan
Bridges completed in 1875
Bridges in Michigan